Mario Jesús Flores Sanguinetti (born 15 October 1973) is a Peruvian football manager and former footballer.

Managerial career
In 2010, Mario Flores was head coach of José Gálvez FBC in the Primera División Peruana. Coach Flores, played for Estudiantes de Medicina, Sport Boys and Universidad San Martín de Porres. In 2009, he coached Sport Ancash.

References

External links

1973 births
Living people
Peruvian footballers
Association football midfielders
Estudiantes de Medicina footballers
Sport Boys footballers
Club Deportivo Universidad de San Martín de Porres players
Peruvian football managers
José Gálvez FBC managers
Atlético Grau managers
Deportivo Binacional FC managers
Sport Áncash managers
Universidad San Martín managers